Noriko Ueda  (born 14 March 1972) is a jazz bassist, composer and arranger.

Ueda was born in Hyogo prefecture, Japan, and is based in New York City. She trained in classical piano and voice, as well as acoustic and electric bass and studied classical voice at the Osaka College of Music and jazz composition at Berklee College of Music.

Ueda is a member of the Sherrie Maricle led all-woman big band the DIVA Jazz Orchestra, as well as the DIVA Jazz Trio and Five Play.

She won the third annual BMI Foundation Charlie Parker Jazz composition prize in 2002 for her work "Castle in the North."

References

External links 
 
 The DIVA Jazz website 

1972 births
Living people
Women jazz composers
Japanese jazz composers
Japanese jazz double-bassists
Musicians from Hyōgo Prefecture
21st-century women musicians
21st-century double-bassists
Osaka College of Music alumni
Berklee College of Music alumni